The Flag of Lord Howe Island is the unofficial flag of the island, an unincorporated area of New South Wales administered by the Lord Howe Island Board. The unofficial flag of Lord Howe Island, which was designed by Sydney-based vexillologist John Vaughan, was first flown in November 1998. The yellow centre of the flag evokes the island's topography and depicts a Kentia palm, while the surrounding area of flag utilizes the pre-1801 Union Jack, excluding the red of St George's Cross and Saint Patrick's Saltire.

References

Lord Howe Island
Lord Howe Island
Flags introduced in 1998
Lord Howe Island
1998 establishments in Australia